Ma'alul was a village, with a mixed population of primarily Muslims with a substantial minority of Palestinian Christians, that was depopulated and destroyed by Israel during the 1948 Arab-Israeli war. Located six kilometers west of the city of Nazareth, many of its inhabitants became internally displaced refugees, after taking refuge in Nazareth and the neighbouring town of Yafa an-Naseriyye. Despite having never left the territory that came to form part of Israel, the majority of the villagers of Maalul, and other Palestinian villages like Andor and Al-Mujidal, were declared "absentees", allowing the confiscation of their land under the Absentees Property Law.

Today, much of the former village's lands are owned by the Jewish National Fund. All that remains of its former structures are two churches, a mosque and a Roman era mausoleum, known locally as Qasr al-Dayr ("Castle of the monastery").

History
In 1850, Rabbi Joseph Schwartz   identified Ma'alul with the Biblical town of Nahalal.

Ottoman era
It paid taxes on a number of crops, including wheat and barley, as well as goats and beehives. 

Ma'alul, and the neighbouring towns and villages of Nazareth, Mejdal, Yafa, Jebatha and Kneffis paid taxes to the monks of Nazareth, who bought the right to collect these taxes from the Ottoman authorities in 1777 for two hundred dollars. Thirty years later, they again purchased this right, though this time for two thousands five hundred dollars, owing to the rise in the price of cereals and ground rents.  Pierre Jacotin called  the village Matoun on his map from 1799.

In 1859 the population was estimated to be 280, who cultivated  42 faddans of land.  In 1875  Victor Guérin found   Ma'alul  to have 350 inhabitants; all Muslim except about 30 "Schismatic Greeks."

By the late nineteenth century, the village was made of adobe bricks, built on a hill, Just outside the village was a magnificent Roman mausoleum, called Qasr al-Dayr.

A population list from about 1887 showed that  Ma'lul had about  650 inhabitants; all Muslims.

British Mandate era

At the beginning of the twentieth century, the people of Ma'alul were tenants of the Sursuq family of Beirut, absentee landlords who had acquired the  village lands earlier. In 1921 the Sursuqs sold all but 2,000 dunams of Ma'alul's land to the Zionist Palestine Land Development Company. Zionist pioneers founded the moshav of Nahalal on that land the same year. The remaining 2,000 dunums were insufficient to support the village's population, so at the request of the Mandate government, the company agreed to lease an additional 3,000 dunams to the villagers until 1927. The villagers had the option to buy this land before the lease expired.

According to the British Mandate's   1922 census of Palestine, Ma'alul had 436 inhabitants; 186 Muslims and 250 Christians,  where all the Christians were  Orthodox. By the  1931 census the population had decreased to 390;   228 Muslims, and 162 Christians, in a total of  90 houses.

In  the 1945 statistics the population of  Ma'alul was 690; 490 Muslims and  200 Christians,   with a total  of  4,698 dunams of land, according to an official land and population survey.  Of this, a total of 650 dunams were for plantations and irrigable land, 3,462 for cereals, while 29 dunams were built-up land.

1948, and aftermath
The village was captured by the Israeli army on 15 July 1948 during Operation Dekel. The villagers were forced to leave and the houses destroyed.

In 1949 an Israeli military base was built on village land.

Walid Khalidi describes the remains of  Ma'alul in 1992:The village site is now covered with a pine forest planted by the Jewish National Fund and dedicated to the memory of prominent Jews and some non-Jewish Americans and Europeans. A military base is also on the site. The mosque and two churches still stand, and are used intermittently as cow sheds by the residents of Kibbutz Kefar ha-Choresh. Overlooking Wadi al-Halabi, between the village site and the site of al-Mujaydil, is an Israeli plastics factory. Cactus, olive trees, and fig trees grow on the site, which is strewn with piles of stones. A few tombs in the Muslim cemetery across from the mosque can be seen. The main village site also contains the remains of houses.

Documentary: Ma'loul Celebrates its Destruction

Ma'alul was the object of the 1985 documentary film by Michel Khleifi; Ma'loul Celebrates its Destruction.

References

Bibliography

External links
Welcome To Ma'lul
Ma'alul,  Zochrot
Survey of Western Palestine, Map 5:  IAA, Wikimedia commons
Ma'lul, at Khalil Sakakini Cultural Center
Ma3lul photos from Dr. Moslih Kanaaneh
The Palestinian narrative has won, By Oudeh Basharat, Haaretz, 24.03.2011

Arab villages depopulated during the 1948 Arab–Israeli War
District of Nazareth